Dominick DeJoseph (October 10, 1915 – January 8, 2000) was a Republican member of the Pennsylvania House of Representatives.

References

1915 births
2000 deaths
Republican Party members of the Pennsylvania House of Representatives
20th-century American politicians